Jindřichov is a village and administrative part of Lučany nad Nisou in the Liberec Region of the Czech Republic. It has about 100 inhabitants. It has a shape of a thin, 3 km long upgoing village.

Villages in Jablonec nad Nisou District
Neighbourhoods in the Czech Republic